Advesha (Sanskrit; Pali: adosa; Tibetan Wylie: zhes sdang med pa) is a Buddhist term translated as "non-aggression"  or "non-hatred". It is defined as the absence of an aggressive attitude towards someone or something that causes pain.  It is one of the mental factors within the Abhidharma teachings. 

The Abhidharma-samuccaya states: 

What is advesha? It is the absence of the intention to harm sentient beings, to quarrel with frustrating situations, and to inflict suffering on those who are the cause of frustration. It functions as a basis for not getting involved with unwholesome behavior.

See also 
 Alobha (Non-greed)
 Amoha (Non-delusion)
 Buddhist paths to liberation
 Mental factors (Buddhism)

Notes

References 
 Guenther, Herbert V. &  Leslie S. Kawamura (1975), Mind in Buddhist Psychology: A Translation of Ye-shes rgyal-mtshan's "The Necklace of Clear Understanding". Dharma Publishing. Kindle Edition.
 Kunsang, Erik Pema (translator) (2004). Gateway to Knowledge, Vol. 1. North Atlantic Books.

External links 
 Ranjung Yeshe wiki entry for zhe_sdang_med_pa
 Berzin Archives glossary entry for "advesha"

Wholesome factors in Buddhism
Religion and peace
Sanskrit words and phrases

ko:불교 용어#무진